King of Comedy is a 1999 Hong Kong comedy film directed by Lee Lik-chi and Stephen Chow. The New King of Comedy, a remake set in mainland China, was released in 2019.

Unlike Chow's typical mo lei tau films, King of Comedy verges on comedy-drama, describing the trials and tribulation an aspiring actor experiences on his way to stardom. Some commentators say the story is based on Chow's early career, as he started off as a temporary actor, before becoming a successful and popular comedy actor over the course of a decade. The film features a short cameo by Jackie Chan, who also got his start as an extra.

Plot

Wan Tin-sau is the head of his village's community centre, where he gives acting lessons and host community plays. On the side, he is an aspiring actor moonlighting as a movie extra, often taking his work too seriously for the roles he receives.

One day, a group of club girls come to ask Wan to help them act like innocent schoolgirls so they can make more money. One of the girls, Lau Piu-piu, although skeptical of advice from an unsuccessful actor, becomes a better actress through Wan's instruction and falls in love with him.

When both characters finally make love, Wan searches his home for enough money to pay Piu-piu for her "services", since he thinks she slept with him for money. After Piu-piu leaves him in anger, he goes back to the film studio and receives a part as leading actor next to a legendary actress, Sister Cuckoo. During this time, Wan reconciles with Piu-piu and he pledges to support her for the rest of his life.

Just as Wan is about to settle in the life of a movie star, his part is given back to a highly sought after male lead. Luckily, he regains his confidence with the help of the misanthropic lunchman at the studio, who is secretly a C.I.B. agent. Wan is used in an undercover operation, where he is disguised as a delivery boy and made to deliver a hidden gun and listening device inside take-out food. Although the ruse is discovered and the C.I.B. undercover agent is shot, Wan takes up the gun and saves the day. The lunchman is rushed to the hospital and survives his wounds.

After a somewhat successful sting, Wan finally becomes famous through a performance of the Thunder Storm. The actors include Piu-piu, Sister Cuckoo, and his wanna-be Triad students. The end of the film involves a blatant marketing plug for Pringles brand potato chips. The entire cast of the play stands backstage rehearsing their lines while literally stuffing their mouths full of Pringles, with the logos of all five cans clearly facing towards the camera. At one point, Wan and one of his triad students argue over who should play the role of Bruce Lee's character, when another actor screams "don't fight, eat chips!" When the closing credits roll, a quick Pringles advertisement appears on the screen.

Cast

Box office
In Hong Kong, the film grossed HK$29,848,860

Award nominations

See also
Stephen Chow filmography
Jackie Chan filmography

References

External links
 
 King of Comedy (1999) at Hong Kong Cinemagic
 King of Comedy at LoveHKFilm
 

1999 films
1999 romantic comedy films
1999 comedy-drama films
Hong Kong romantic comedy films
Hong Kong comedy-drama films
1990s Cantonese-language films
Films directed by Stephen Chow
Films about actors
Films set in Hong Kong
Films shot in Hong Kong
Films directed by Lee Lik-chi
1990s Hong Kong films